The fluoronium ion is an inorganic cation with the chemical formula . It is one of the cations found in fluoroantimonic acid. The structure of the salt with the  anion, has been determined. The fluoronium ion is isoelectronic with the  water molecule and the azanide ion.

The term can also refer to organyl substituted species of type H––R, R––R, or R2C=F+.  In contrast to the heavier halogens, which have long been known to form open-chain halonium ions (such as [Me2Cl]+[Al(OTeF6)4]–)  as well as cyclic haliranium ions, fluorine was not believed to form fluoronium ions of type R––R until the recent characterization of a fluoronium ion locked in a designed cage structure by Lectka and coworkers. Recent solvolysis experiments and NMR spectroscopic studies on a metastable [C–F–C]+ fluoronium ion strongly support the divalent fluoronium structure over the alternative rapidly equilibrating classical carbocation. Definitive structural proof of the symmetrical [C–F–C]+ was reported by Riedel, Lectka, and coworkers by single crystal X-ray diffraction analysis. Besides its synthesis and crystallographic characterization as the [Sb2F11]− salt, vibrational spectra could be recorded and a detailed analysis concerning the nature of the bonding situation in this fluoronium ion and its heavier halonium homologues was reported.

References 

Cations
Fluorine compounds
Hydrogen compounds